The Jammu and Kashmir women's cricket team is a women's cricket team that represents the Indian union territory of Jammu and Kashmir. The team competes in the Women's Senior One Day Trophy and the Women's Senior T20 Trophy.

See also
 Jammu and Kashmir cricket team
 Sports in Jammu and Kashmir

References

Women's cricket teams in India
Cricket in Jammu and Kashmir